Plastered in Paris is a 1928 American comedy film directed by Benjamin Stoloff and starring Sammy Cohen, Jack Pennick and Lola Salvi.

Originally made as a silent film, music and sound effects were then added using the Movietone system. It was intended as a parody of Foreign Legion films such as Beau Geste. However, this drew some criticism for its mockery of the Foreign Legion, which an observer compared to the British Guards Regiments as being above parody.

In the film, two veterans of the American Legion enlist in the French Foreign Legion by mistake. They are assigned a mission in North Africa.

Synopsis
Two former American doughboys return to Paris after ten years for an American Legion convention. However, due to a mistake, they end up joining the French Foreign Legion. While serving in North Africa they rescue a General's daughter from a harem.

Cast
 Sammy Cohen as Sammy Nosenblum  
 Jack Pennick as Bud Swenson 
 Lola Salvi as Marcelle  
 Ivan Linow as Sergeant Cou Cou  
 Hugh Allan as Hugh  
 Marion Byron as Mimi  
 Michael Visaroff as French General  
 Albert Conti as Abou Ben Abed  
 August Tollaire as Doctor

References

Bibliography
 Solomon, Aubrey. The Fox Film Corporation, 1915-1935: A History and Filmography. McFarland, 2011.
 Lee Grieveson & Peter Kramer. The Silent Cinema Reader. Psychology Press, 2004.

External links

1928 films
1928 comedy films
1920s parody films
Silent American comedy films
Films directed by Benjamin Stoloff
1920s English-language films
Fox Film films
Films set in Paris
Films set in Africa
Films about the French Foreign Legion
American black-and-white films
1920s American films